Francophone Canadians (or French-speaking Canadians) are citizens of Canada who speak French. In 2011, 9,809,155 people in Canada, or 30.1% of the population, were Francophone, including 7,274,090 people, or 22% of the population, who declared that they had French as their mother tongue.

Distribution

Six million French-speaking Canadians reside in Quebec, where they constitute the main linguistic group, and another one million reside in other Canadian regions. The largest portion of Francophones outside Quebec live in Ontario, followed by New Brunswick, but they can be found in all provinces and territories. The presence of French in Canada comes mainly from French colonization in America that occurred in the 16th to 18th centuries.

Francophones in Canada are not all of French Canadian or French descent, particularly in the English-speaking provinces of Ontario and Western Canada. Canadians of French Canadian or French origin are also not all Francophone, even if a very large majority are. 

Unlike Francophones in Quebec, who generally identify simply as Québécois, Francophones outside Quebec generally identify as Francophone Canadians (e.g. Franco-Ontarians, Franco-Manitobans, etc.), the exception being Acadians, who constitute their own cultural group, and live in Acadia in the Maritime provinces. New Brunswick is Canada's only officially bilingual province. All three territories (the Yukon, the Northwest Territories, and Nunavut) include French among their official languages.

Flags of French Canada

References

This article has been partially or totally translated from the French-language article Canadiens francophones.

See also
French Canada
French Canadian
Geographical distribution of French speakers
Varieties of French
Francization

French Canada
Francophonie